The McLaren MP4-16 was the car with which the McLaren team competed in the 2001 Formula One World Championship. The chassis was designed by Adrian Newey, Steve Nichols, Neil Oatley and Peter Prodromou, with Mario Illien designing the bespoke Ilmor engine. It was driven by double world champion Mika Häkkinen and David Coulthard in what would be their sixth and final season together as McLaren teammates.

Competition history

However, the season proved to be frustrating in more ways than one. The chassis was good, but it was not developed enough to keep pace with Ferrari or new rivals Williams and also suffered from niggling aerodynamic problems; the Mercedes-Benz engines were less powerful than Williams's BMW units and less reliable than Ferrari's in-house efforts; and the team did not do a good enough job regarding the return of electronic driver aids.

Moreover, Häkkinen had his least successful season since , suffering both from appalling luck and a loss of form at many races. The most notable incident was in Spain when he suffered a last-lap clutch/engine failure while leading. Despite winning two Grands Prix, he elected to retire (originally announced as a sabbatical) at the end of the season, and would be replaced by compatriot Kimi Räikkönen.  Coulthard, by contrast, produced the best season of his career to date, winning two races early on and mounting a championship challenge to Michael Schumacher.  However, McLaren lost this early parity with Ferrari and he was fortunate to keep second place in the Drivers' Championship ahead of Ferrari's number two, Rubens Barrichello.

Similarly, the team regarded themselves as fortunate to come second in the Constructors' Championship, with 102 points, ahead of the resurgent Williams team.

Livery 
McLaren Mercedes went into the 2001 season with renewed major sponsorships such as West, Mobil 1, Mercedes-Benz, Hugo Boss, Sun Microsystems, Computer Associates, Warsteiner, Schüco and Loctite. McLaren-Mercedes received new sponsorship such as SAP, Siemens Mobile and discontinued sponsorships are Fujitsu Siemens. The livery was similar to the 2000 design with subtle changes.

McLaren used 'West' logos, except at the French and British Grands Prix.

Complete Formula One results
(key) (results in bold indicate pole position; results in italics indicate fastest lap)

References

External links

McLaren MP4 16
2001 Formula One season cars